Syngamia fervidalis is a moth in the family Crambidae. It was described by Zeller in 1852. It is found in Equatorial Guinea, Malawi, Sierra Leone and South Africa.

References

Moths described in 1852
Spilomelinae